Roger Quentin Randle (born 15 May 1974 in Hastings, New Zealand) is a New Zealand former rugby union player. He played as a wing for the All Blacks. He is currently assistant coach for Chiefs and Maori All Blacks.

Career
Randle played for the Wellington Hurricanes (1996–1997), Waikato Chiefs (1998–2003 and 2005–2006) in the Super 14 competition and for CS Bourgoin-Jallieu (France, 2004–2005). He was top try scorer in the 2002 super 12 season with 13 tries and in 2002 NPC season with 12 tries. He represented the New Zealand Colts in 1995 and he also represented the New Zealand Māori rugby union team in 1996, 1998, 1999, 2000, 2001, 2002, 2003. He won two Commonwealth gold medals with New Zealand 7's in 1998 Kuala Lumpur and 2002 in Manchester. He made his debut for the All Blacks in November 2001 against Ireland A.

Statistics
Randle is the second highest tryscorer in Chiefs history with (38),
 most tries in a Ranfurly Shield season 14,
 most tries in a Waikato season 16,
 second most tries in a Hawkes Bay season 17.
 Hawkes Bay (1994–1997)
 Wellington Hurricanes (1996–1997)
 Waikato (1998–2004,2006)
 Waikato Chiefs( 1998–2004)
 New Zealand U21 (1995)
 New Zealand 7's (1995–2002)
 New Zealand Maori (1995–2003)
 New Zealand All Blacks (2001–2002)

External links
 

1974 births
Living people
New Zealand rugby union coaches
New Zealand rugby union players
New Zealand international rugby union players
Rugby union players from Hastings, New Zealand
Commonwealth Games gold medallists for New Zealand
Chiefs (rugby union) players
Hurricanes (rugby union) players
Hawke's Bay rugby union players
Waikato rugby union players
CS Bourgoin-Jallieu players
New Zealand expatriate rugby union players
New Zealand expatriate sportspeople in Italy
New Zealand expatriate sportspeople in France
Expatriate rugby union players in Italy
Expatriate rugby union players in France
Māori All Blacks players
Rugby sevens players at the 1998 Commonwealth Games
New Zealand male rugby sevens players
Rugby sevens players at the 2002 Commonwealth Games
Commonwealth Games rugby sevens players of New Zealand
New Zealand international rugby sevens players
Commonwealth Games medallists in rugby sevens
Medallists at the 1998 Commonwealth Games
Medallists at the 2002 Commonwealth Games